Scottish media has a long and distinct history. Scotland has a wide range of different types and quality of media.

Broadcasting

Television

BBC Scotland runs two national television stations. Much of the output of BBC Scotland Television, such as local news, current affairs and sport programmes are intended for broadcast within Scotland, whilst others, for example many drama and comedy programmes, aim at audiences throughout the United Kingdom and worldwide markets.

Three ITV stations also broadcast in Scotland. STV broadcasts to the majority of the Scottish population. Although branded as one channel, it is composed of two stations: STV Central and STV North, both of which are both owned by STV Group plc. ITV Border broadcasts in the South of Scotland.

BBC Alba is the only Gaelic language television service available in Scotland, broadcasting digital terrestrial platform Freeview, as well as Sky, Virgin Media and Freesat.

In 2014, STV Group plc launched two super-local TV services, STV Glasgow in 2014 and STV Edinburgh in 2015. Following the awarding of local broadcasting licences for Aberdeen, Ayr and Dundee in 2015 to STV Group, it combined its two existing stations with the new licences and relaunched the new stations as a single network, branded STV2 in April 2017.

Radio

Scotland has its own BBC services which include the national radio stations, BBC Radio Scotland and Scottish Gaelic language service, BBC Radio nan Gaidheal, which is available in the North of Scotland. There are also a number of BBC and independent local radio stations throughout the country.

Print

Newspapers

There are four national daily newspapers in Scotland:

The Daily Record (Trinity Mirror) is Scotland's leading tabloid
The Scotsman (Johnston Press), based in Edinburgh, is a former broadsheet now printed in tabloid format
The Herald (Newsquest), based in Glasgow, is Scotland's only broadsheet newspaper
The National (Newsquest), based in Glasgow, launched in 2014 following the 2014 independence referendum.

Sunday newspapers include the tabloid Sunday Mail (published by the Daily Record'''s parent company, Trinity Mirror) and the Sunday Post (D.C. Thomson & Co.), while the Sunday Herald and Scotland on Sunday have associations with The Herald and The Scotsman respectively.

National UK-wide newspapers such as The Times, The Daily Telegraph, Daily Express, Daily Mail, Daily Star, Daily Mirror & The Sun publish Scottish editions of their paper. 

Regional dailies include The Courier and Advertiser in Dundee and the east, and The Press and Journal serving Aberdeen and the north.

Magazines

There are over 700 magazines published in Scotland, by nearly 200 organisations, with an estimated total turnover of £157m per annum.

Awards
Print publications and journalists in Scotland are recognised for their quality at the Scottish Press Awards.

Film

Scotland has produced many award winning and high-grossing films produced and filmed in the country, such as Trainspotting, and Shallow Grave. It has also produced many award winning actors, directors and producers.

Online
Television broadcasters BBC Scotland, STV, ITV and most newspapers in Scotland (like The Herald and The Scotsman'') also provide online content and blogs.

Other notable Scottish online news and commentary sites include: Bella Caledonia, and The Ferret.

Dàna is the only Scottish Gaelic news source independent of the BBC at present; it is an online magazine.

See also
Media in Scotland
Gaelic broadcasting in Scotland
Scottish Broadcasting Commission
List of Scotland-based production companies

References

Mass media in Scotland
Scotland
Scottish culture